The 2022 Shpageeza Cricket League was the eighth edition of the Shpageeza Cricket League, a professional Twenty20 cricket (T20) league established by the Afghanistan Cricket Board (ACB) in 2013, and the fourth edition to have official T20 status. It was originally scheduled to run from 10 to 25 September 2021, with the number of teams increased from six to eight. However, no tournament took place in 2021, with the Afghanistan Cricket Board (ACB) announcing that the tournament would be played in June and July 2022. The Kabul Eagles are the defending champions.

Despite Afghanistan being brought under the control of the Taliban in August 2021, reports have stated that the Taliban had no issue with cricket, with the tournament scheduled to take place as planned. The Afghanistan cricket team were scheduled to tour Sri Lanka in September 2021 to play the Pakistan cricket team. In the event of that tour not taking place as planned, the ACB stated that the T20 tournament could be brought forward. However, as a result of the logistical problems regarding travelling to Sri Lanka, the matches were moved to Pakistan, before being postponed. In the final Speenghar Tigers defeated Boost Defenders by 6 runs to win their 3rd title.

Squads
Squads were announced on 11 June 2022.

Standings

Points table

  Advanced to the qualifiers
  Advanced  to the eliminator
  Eliminated from Tournament

Fixtures

Knockout stage

Qualifier 1

Eliminator

Qualifier 2

Final

References

Shpageeza Cricket League
Shpageeza Cricket League
Shpageeza Cricket League